The Gifts is a 1970 American short documentary film about water pollution in the United States. The film was produced by Robert McBride for the United States Environmental Protection Agency. It was nominated for an Academy Award for Best Documentary Short.

References

External links
The Gifts at Richter Productions

The Gifts at the National Archives and Records Administration
The Gift - NeedvWant

1970 films
1970 documentary films
1970 short films
American short documentary films
American independent films
Documentary films about water and the environment
1970s short documentary films
1970 independent films
Water pollution in the United States
1970s English-language films
1970s American films